Lord Somers Camp, or "Big Camp", is an annual week-long camp for boys and girls held in Somers, Victoria, Australia.

Founded in Anglesea, Victoria, in 1929 by The 6th Baron Somers, the then Governor of Victoria, the camp has been running continuously since 1929, excluding the Second World War years of 1941-1946 when the site was occupied by the RAAF. The 2021 camps have both been postponed due to COVID-19.

There are two camps, one for young men and one for young women, typically taking place in the 2nd and 3rd week of January each year.

History
The original camp was set up in 1929 by the then Governor of Victoria, Lord Somers. Somers aimed to duplicate the success of the hugely popular Duke of York Camps which were held in the United Kingdom. The first and second camps were held at Anglesea, Victoria, with the assistance of the Anglesea Scouts. The camp moved then relocated to a purpose-built site, designed by Stephenson and Meldrum in Somers in 1931. Only two of the original buildings still stand today, including the Executive Hut (staff quarters) and the Mess Hut (dining hall).

Power House
In order to provide a meeting and social outlet for the camp's participants, a clubhouse located at Albert Park Lake in Melbourne was built in 1932. Called "Power House", the activities expanded into sporting clubs, including rowing, rugby, athletics, hockey, and Australian rules football. Whilst the clubs were originally set up solely for the use of Lord Somers Camp members, gradually the clubs forged their own identity and separated into their own legal entities due to public liability insurances issues in the 1980s. Today, they operate completely independently.

Today
The camps are operated and staffed completely by volunteers who even have to pay for privilege and give up a week of their holidays. The exact program has been adjusted in line with community expectations and social changes over the years.

In 1986, a female equivalent of the Camp, Lady Somers Camp commenced  and has arguably been more successful. It typically follows the boys' camp in January each year.

Other programs followed, including Diversity (for the intellectuality and physically challenged), VSK (Very Special Kids), and more recently Mirabel. Again, all managed and operated by LSC&PH volunteers.

The township of East Balnarring was renamed Somers, Victoria after the camp.

External links
 Lord Somers Camp & Power House website
 Lord Somers Camp Commercial Hire
 Big Camp

References

Summer camps
1929 establishments in Australia
Youth organisations based in Australia